The Clark County Fire Department (CCFD) provides fire protection and emergency medical services for the unincorporated areas of Clark County, Nevada, United States. The cities of Las Vegas, Boulder City, North Las Vegas, Henderson and Mesquite each have their own fire department, but emergency management is provided by the county government.

History 
In 1953, Las Vegas was growing rapidly with a growth from 8,422 residents in 1940 to over 64,000 in 1960. Meanwhile, Clark County had reached a population of 127,016. The unprecedented growth created a greater need for fire protection. The Clark County Fire Department was formally created on November 23, 1953. The revenues from the towns of Winchester and Paradise provided funds for the construction of the first station.

Fire Administration

The CCFD is headed by a Fire Chief, currently John C. Steinbeck, who replaced former Fire Chief Greg Cassell  on Feb. 7, 2020.

The CCFD organization consists of six bureaus. Each bureau is commanded by a Deputy Fire Chief. These bureaus include:

Bureau of Finance Administration
Office of Emergency Management 
Bureau of Support Services
Bureau of Emergency Medical Services
Bureau of Operations Training
Bureau of Homeland Security

Command Staff

USAR Task Force 

The CCFD is the founding member of Nevada Task Force 1 (NVTF-1), one of 28 Federal Emergency Management Agency (FEMA) Urban Search and Rescue Task Forces (USAR-TF) that are prepared to respond to state or federal disasters throughout the United States. The task force team is deployed by FEMA for the rescue of victims of structural collapses due to man-made or natural disasters.

Notable fires

MGM Grand Fire

On November 21, 1980, the MGM Grand Hotel and Casino (now Horseshoe Las Vegas) in Paradise, Nevada suffered a major fire. The fire killed 85 people, most through smoke inhalation. The CCFD was the first agency to respond, and thus was in command at the scene of the fire, which remains the worst disaster in Nevada history, and the third-worst hotel fire in modern United States history.

PEPCON Disaster

The PEPCON disaster was an industrial disaster that occurred in Henderson on May 4, 1988, at the Pacific Engineering and Production Company of Nevada (PEPCON) plant. The fire and subsequent explosions killed 2 and injured 372 people and caused an estimated US$100 million of damage. A large portion of the Las Vegas Valley within a  radius of the plant was affected, and several agencies activated disaster plans.

Stations & Apparatus

The CCFD is spread out throughout the unincorporated areas of the county in 42 separate fire stations, including one located at Harry Reid International Airport.

References

External links
Current active calls

Fire Department
Fire departments in Nevada
Ambulance services in the United States
Medical and health organizations based in Nevada